SIP is an open source software tool used to connect computer programs or libraries written in C or C++ with the scripting language Python. It is an alternative to SWIG.

SIP was originally developed in 1998 for PyQt — the Python bindings for the Qt GUI toolkit — but is suitable for generating bindings for any C or C++ library.

Concept

SIP takes a set of specification files describing the API and generates the required C++ code. This is then compiled to produce the Python extension modules. A .sip file is essentially the class header file with some things removed (because SIP does not include a full C++ parser) and some things added (because C++ does not always provide enough information about how the API works).

Notable applications that use SIP

 PyQt, a python port of the application framework and widget toolkit Qt
 QGIS, a free and open-source cross-platform desktop geographic information system (GIS)
 QtiPlot, a computer program to analyze and visualize scientific data
 calibre (software), a free and open-source cross-platform e-book manager
 Veusz, a free and open-source cross-platform program to visualize scientific data

References

Programming tools
Free computer programming tools
Scripting languages